Brazil v Germany may refer to:

2002 FIFA World Cup Final
Brazil v Germany (2014 FIFA World Cup)